This list contains the names of albums that contain a hidden track and also information on how to find them. Not all printings of an album contain the same track arrangements, so some copies of a particular album may not have the hidden track(s) listed below. Some of these tracks may be hidden in the pregap, and some hidden simply as a track following the listed tracks. The list is ordered by artist name using the surname where appropriate.

 Raphael Saadiq, Stone Rollin': "The Perfect Storm" follows silence after "The Answer", the last listed track.
 Saliva, Survival of the Sickest: There are two tracks after the final listed track, "No Hard Feelings". One is a 5-second long blank track. The other is the song "Sex, Drugs & Rock N' Roll".
 Salt the Wound, Kill the Crown: The final track "Consequence" is a 7:07 long instrumental, followed by silence until 11:57, where an outtake of the album's title track begins to play.
 Roger Sanchez: First Contact (2001): A two-minute track can be found before track 1.
 Sanctifica, Negative B (2002): Band members talking for 9:20 before track 1.
 Santana, Supernatural (1999): "Day of Celebration" (appears 12 seconds after "The Calling")
 Satyricon, Rebel Extravaganza (1999): "Untitled" (pre ghost track before "Tied in Bronze Chains")
 Savatage:
 A hidden instrumental track titled "Island of the Kings" can be found on the 2002 Metal Blade re-issue of the album Sirens at track index 99;
 A hidden track titled "Piper Rap" can be found on the 2002 Metal Blade re-issue of the album The Dungeones Are Calling at track index 99. Both of these hidden Savatage tracks are currently available for download on iTunes.
 SBK: Killing Field: Contains cleaning disc with two unlisted musical tracks. The first is before the blank cleaning track, and contains instructions in a polite, female Japanese voice on how to use the disc. The other is after the cleaning track, in four parts: (1) additional comments in Japanese by the same voice from the first track; (2) a male voice cursing out the idea of having a cleaning disk included with the SBK CD; (3) a repeating R&B piano/guitar riff (from Own to the Next from the music disc) with singers doing a couple lines of a song in English, along with a male speaker giving English-language acknowledgements (from Outro from the music disc); and (4) the repeating R&B piano/guitar riff with occasional hip-hop scratching mixed in (also from Own to the Next).
 Scared Weird Little Guys: "Live at 42 Walnut Crescent": Track 26 "McDonald's Song" follows a minute of silence after Track 25, and is not listed on the album cover.
 Scissor Sisters:
 Scissor Sisters: "A message from Ms. Matronic", a recorded message referencing the following bonus tracks, appears as track 12 on the UK edition but is unlisted.
 Ta-Dah: On the UK edition, between the songs "Everyone Wants the Same Thing" and "Transistor", is a two-minute pregap, which is almost complete silence except for a sound at the end, which is the sound of a lift (or elevator) reaching its destination floor.
 Scooter, Push the Beat for this Jam (The Singles 98-02): "The Logical Song" was a hidden track on the U.S. version of the album as track 18.
 Scorn, Logghi Barogghi: Contains a hidden pregap track. Though it sound more like a pressing error due to the typical noise sound of a wrong read CD.
 Scorpions, Face the Heat (1993): "Marie's The Name (Of His Latest Flame)": (Segued to the last track)
 Scouting for Girls: "Michaela Strachan" at 3:47 of the song "James Bond"
Scratch21: "Happy Family" is an unlisted track on the cd release
 Seafood, When Do We Start Fighting... (2001): "Clueso" (Segued to last track)
 Seasick Steve:
 cheap (2004): "Riding the Free Freight Tonight" plays after a few seconds of silence after the last track
 Dog House Music (2006): "12 Dog Blues" is played after a few seconds of silence after the last track
 I Started Out with Nothin and I Still Got Most of It Left (2008): a hidden track is played after a few seconds of silence after the last track.
 Man From Another Time (2009): ""I'm So Lonesome I Could Cry" plays after a few seconds of silence after the last track.
 Seether:
 Karma and Effect: At the end of a 4-minute silence a song in South African is sung called Kom Saam Met My. The 4-minute silence is part of a track called Plastic Man.
 Finding Beauty in Negative Spaces: The album, which was originally released in October 2007, was re-released in April 2009 with two hidden tracks. The band recorded a cover of Careless Whisper, originally by George Michael. The first hidden track is the album version of the song and the second hidden track is the "strings version", which is a shorter edit and includes strings in the background.
 Sense Field: Living Outside: "The Horse is Alive" follows the silence after "Haunted".
 Sepultura:
 Chaos A.D. (1993): On the original version (without the bonus tracks) there's a secret track that appears a minute after the last song "Clenched Fist". It consists of the bandmembers laughing insanely, one at a time.
 Roots (1996): "Canyon Jam" is not listed on the tracklist.
 Roorback (2003): There is a hidden track called "Bullet the Blue Sky" following silence after "Outro".
 Seven Mary Three, Orange Ave. (1998): "Talk to You Like That" following silence after "Devil's Holy Joke"
 Shadow Gallery:
 Carved In Stone: At the end of the song "Ghostship" is a 7-minute hidden track called "TG94 (Thanks Giving 1994)". Also tracks 2, 4, 6, 10 and 12 are not listed on the album's back cover. These instrumental segues are commonly referred to as "Interlude" 1 through 5.
 Legacy: Near the end of "First Light" the music fades out to silence at approximately 23:30. At 24:10 an "in-studio noises", made of voices, vocal warming, laughs and some instruments breaks the silence, followed by knocking and doorbells ringing from 27:21 until 28:25, when an explosion is heard as the door is opened. Following this is a 5-minute instrumental track.
 She Wants Revenge, She Wants Revenge (2006): "Killing Joke" (This song is number 66 on the album, after 53 blank tracks)
 SHeDAISY
 Brand New Year: Following the last song, "Brand New Year (My Revolution)", the song "How Can I Keep From Singing" plays on the same track. The fourteenth track is unlisted and contains six seconds of silence.
 Knock on the Sky: "Knock on the Sky" plays after about 15 minutes of silence on track 13. After this, an unlisted fourteenth track plays, consisting of six seconds of silence.
 Ed Sheeran, +: Sheeran's cover of "The Parting Glass" begins playing at five minutes and 49 seconds into track 12, "Give Me Love", shortly after it ends.
 Duncan Sheik:
 Humming (1998): "Foreshadowing": 8:06 (Segued to last track)
 Daylight (2002): "Chimera": 8:06 (Segued to last track)
 Coyote Shivers: the self-titled album has a hidden track which consists of the entire album played over again.
 Michelle Shocked:
 Short Sharp Shocked (1988): An unlisted version of Shocked's "Fogtown" (which originally appeared in acoustic form on The Texas Campfire Tapes) recorded with punk band MDC appears after "Black Widow".
 Captain Swing (1989): "Russian Roulette" appears as an unlisted final track, after "Must Be Luff".
 Shooting at Unarmed Men: "Yes! Tinnitus!" (2006): "In Flight Instructions Are A Joke - Say I", after a few seconds, begins rewinding the album and takes you back to the very beginning, and plays you through it all again to the end of "In Flight..."; it is the only album ever made where the entire album is repeated as a secret track.
 Show of Hands:
 Dark Fields (1997): A reprise of "The Train" follows the last track on the album, "High Germany/Molly Oxford" after a short amount of silence
 As You Were (2005): Live between-song banter comes after 3 minutes and 33 seconds of silence following the last track on CD2, "Don't Be a Stranger".
 Arrogance Ignorance and Greed (2009): There is a thirteenth track, which is completely unlisted and untitled.
 Showbread: Age of Reptiles (2006): After the song "Age of Reptiles", a waning sound is heard for about 15 seconds, which leads into the acoustic hidden track known as "Age of Insects". The guitar comes in at approximately 6:46. This hidden track is especially important to listen to in order to understand the overall message of the album.
 Sia, Some People Have Real Problems (2008): "Buttons" Song included within final track and after song "Lullaby"
 Sick Puppies: Welcome to the Real World (2001): an unnamed song about Speedy and Spendy, preceded by band members Shimon Moore and Chris Mileski announcing the listener's discovery of the bonus track, follows 2:30 after the radio edit for "Rock Kids", the last listed track.
 Sido, Aggro Berlin (2009): "Outro" Song starts 10 sec. later
 Sigur Rós, Von (1997): "Rukrym" (listed but does not play until 6 minutes have passed)
 Silverchair, Diorama (2002): An instrumental piano piece begins about five minutes after the last song "After All These Years" has ended.
 Silversun Pickups, Pikul (2005): "Sci-Fi Lullaby" plays following 17 44-second tracks of silence after the last track on the album.
 Simple Plan:
 No Pads, No Helmets...Just Balls (2003): "Grow Up" and "Christmas List" (End of album)
 Still Not Getting Any... (2005): "Untitled" after "One"
 Simply Red, Life (1995): A reprise of Fairground is an unlisted track after "We're in This Together".
 Sims: Lights Out Paris (2005): "Spinal Tap".
 Sing-Sing: The Joy of Sing-Sing (2001): "Keep It That Way" follows silence
 Sister Machine Gun, Burn (1995): "Strange Days" (The Doors cover), found by rewinding Track 1
 Skankin' Pickle:
 Sing Along With Skankin' Pickle (1994): Track 16 is untitled and unlisted on the album.
 The Green Album (1996): An unlisted 14th track consists of a 1:40 song, followed by about ten minutes of silence, then a recording of band members Mike Park and Lynnette Knackstedt performing several short, unfinished songs, the last of which ends abruptly as the album runs out of time.
 Skillet, Invincible (2000): The final song "You're in My Brain" contains a hidden track titled "Angels Fall Down".
 Skinny Puppy, Bites (1985): The final track "One Day" is not credited on the CD.
 Skulker:
 Morgan to the Moon (1998): Two unlisted telephone conversations (4:20–5:05 & 5:12-6:08) hidden after "Chicken & Rice". A man orders chicken and rice from a Thai restaurant, then calls back to learn how to make the dish.
 Bittersweet (1998): "Morgan to the Moon (remix)" at 3:57 after "Doofus".
 Skunk Anansie, Stoosh (1996): Press rewind when the first track "Yes it's Fucking Political" starts and 2 minutes and 42 seconds of music is there.
 Slipknot:
 Slipknot (1999): "Eeyore" (Starts after the end of the song "Scissors" at about 16 minutes and 19 seconds, after the members view a scene of a pornographic film that involves coprophilia.)
 Mate. Feed. Kill. Repeat. (1996): "Dogfish Rising" (Starts after the song "Killers Are Quiet" at about 5 minutes and 10 seconds of industrial sounds.)
 Vol. 3: (The Subliminal Verses) (2004): There is a brief interlude after the song "Before I Forget".
 .5: The Gray Chapter (2014): There are three untitled hidden tracks later known as "Silent", "Talk" and "Funny" at the end of the album.
 Sly & Robbie - Late Night Tales(2003): La Isla Bonita Cover by Sly & Robbie of Madonna track. Press rewind when the first track starts and 3 minutes and 59 seconds of music is there
 Smalltown Poets, Smalltown Poets (1997): A studio outtake of "Trust" involving a prank played on the lead singer appears after "Inside the Bubble".
 Smash Mouth:
 The East Bay Sessions (1999): "To Be Continued" appears between "Come On, Come On" and "Solitude".
 The Smashing Pumpkins:
 Gish (1991): "I'm Going Crazy" appears shortly after "Daydream".
 Cherub Rock (1993): "The Star Spangled Banner" appears shortly after "French Movie Theme". This version was sung by a karaoke DJ at a bar and recorded by Billy Corgan on a tape player he happened to have with him at the time.
 Smile Empty Soul, Vultures (2006): The final track, Vultures, contains an untitled track behind fifteen minutes of silence.
 Jimmy Smith, Root Down: The 2000 CD reissue contains a hidden track in the pregap before track 1, consisting of Smith making stage announcements prior to performing "Sagg Shootin' His Arrow".
 Michael W. Smith, Live the Life: A reprise of "Live the Life" appears at the end of track 12, "Hello, Goodbye"
 Will Smith, Lost & Found: After the last track, a minute of silence will lead to the Reggae Remix to Switch featuring Elephant Man.
 Todd Snider: Songs for the Daily Planet: "Talkin' Seattle Grunge Rock Blues" (begins at 4:55 of "Joe's Blues")
 Snot, Strait Up (2000): Untitled track that begins 3:13 into the song. It features a mix of songs from Snot's previous album Get Some, which were mixed by DJ Lethal.
 Social Distortion, White Light, White Heat, White Trash (1996): Unlisted track 12 is a cover of "Under My Thumb" by The Rolling Stones
 Son of Dork, Welcome to Loserville (2005): Two hidden tracks in the pregap, which are choral versions to some of the songs on the album. Another hidden track, a one-minute choral version of "Murdered in the Mosh", appears after approximately ten minutes of silence at the end of track 10, "Murdered in the Mosh".
 Sons of Butcher, Meatlantis (2006): A remix of "Dear John", appears after approximately 1-minute and 30 seconds after the final track, "Meatlantis Reprise".
 Sonata Arctica, Reckoning Night (2004): the unofficially titled "Jam" appears unlisted as the final track.
 Sonic Youth:
 Experimental Jet Set, Trash and No Star (1994) has a short snippet of noise and a voice speaking Japanese after the last track "Sweet Shine".
 Washing Machine (1995): Track number 9 is skipped in the listing. It is an instrumental piece, usually called "Becuz Coda" on websites dedicated to the band.
 Sophie Ellis-Bextor, Shoot from the Hip (2003): On the final track Hello, Hello, a cover version of Olivia Newton-John's Physical begins to play after a short time of silence. This only appears in the UK Version.
 Soul Position, 8 Million Stories (album) (2003): An untitled hidden track appears after approximately four minutes of silence at the end of track 16, "1 Love".
 Soulfly:
 Soulfly (1998): Contains hidden track "Sultao Das Matas" after "Karmageddon".
 Prophecy (2004): Contains hidden track "Marš na Drinu" after "Wings".
 Soulsavers, It's Not How Far You Fall, It's the Way You Land (2007): an instrumental song of 2 minutes can be heard 30 seconds after the final track.
 Soulwax:
 Leave the Story Untold (1996): An untitled hidden track is hidden in the pregap before track 1. Also there is a hidden track which starts after the final track.
 Much Against Everyone's Advice (2000): Untitled track in pregap before track 1
 Any Minute Now (2004): Untitled track in pregap before track 1, which later became "I Love Techno", a song featured on their next album.
 Nite Versions (2005): Untitled track in pregap before track 1, which is a 51-second instrumental borrowing the guitar riff from "E Talking"
 Most of the Remixes... (2007): A hidden track is hidden in the pregap of disc 2, which is Einstürzende Neubauten's "Stella Maris (Soulwax Remix)". It is the 'lost' remix mentioned in the full title of the album.
 This is Radio Soulwax (2006): Brief pregaps appear between all the songs, that last less than a second. As the album is a "non-stop" mix album, these pregaps contain brief fragments of music.
 The Sound, From the Lions Mouth (2002): "In the Hothouse" appears 90 seconds after "New Dark Age" ends on the CD reissue.
 Spahn Ranch:
 Collateral Damage: Untitled hidden track number 11.
 The Blackmail Starters Kit: Untitled hidden track number 7.
 Breath And Taxes: Untitled hidden track number 8.
 The Coiled One: Untitled hidden track number 11.
 Spacehog:
 Resident Alien (1995): Hidden track "Untitled" follows the track "To Be A Millionaire...Was It Likely?" after a pause of eleven minutes. It goes on to about 21:19
 The Hogyssey (2001): Hidden Track "I Can't Hear You" after a long period of silence at the last track "The Horror". It ends at 17:25.
 Sam Sparro, Sam Sparro (2008): Hidden track "Still Hungry" follows track 13 "Can't Stop This" at 08:07.
 Sparklehorse, It's A Wonderful Life (2001): Hidden track "Morning Hollow" follows the 13th track, "Babies on Sun", after a period of silence.
 Britney Spears: "Oops!... I Did It Again" contains three unlisted skits following the songs "Don't Go Knocking On My Door", "What U See (Is What U Get)", and "When Your Eyes Say It" (US edition) or "Heart" (International edition).
 Spiderbait:
 The Unfinished Spanish Galleon Of Finley Lake (1995): The first part of Track 12, "Detective", lasts for approximately 3:20, then after 5 minutes of silence (3:20 - 8:20) begins another section which runs for approximately 2:30, where instructional audio on tabla playing is accompanied by a MIDI track reminiscent of a Casio keyboard tune.
 Ivy And The Big Apples (1996): Two hidden tracks appear after one minute of silence (6:45 - 7:45) on the final track "Driving Up The Ceiling".
 Davy Spillane, Atlantic Bridge (1986): There is an unlisted track 11, which consists of 13 seconds of various noises.
 Spin Doctors:
 You've Got To Believe In Something (1996): Cover of KC and the Sunshine Band's "That's the Way (I Like It)" featuring Biz Markie (Track 12)
 Here Comes The Bride (1999): "Let's Try Again" (Segued to last track "Tomorrow Can Pay The Rent". This hidden track is notable as it is reversed and can only be heard properly if played backwards.)
 Spinal Tap, Break Like the Wind (1992): "Untitled" (Track 13)
 Sponge:
 Rotting Piñata (1994) features a track called "Candy Corn", hidden between "Rainin'" (track 10) and four seconds of silence (track 11).
 Wax Ecstatic (1996) features a song called Imagine You at 3:41 after the song Velveteen.
 Spring Heeled Jack USA, Static World View (1996): Approximately fifteen minutes after the end of the album's last track, a male voice says "You fast forwarded half an hour for nothing. How do you feel?"
 Bruce Springsteen:
 Magic (2007): "Terry's Song" (Track 12) is hidden after Devil's Arcade and was written as a memorial to Springsteen's friend, who had died shortly before the album was released.
 Bruce Springsteen & the E Street Band: Live In New York City: Track 11 on disc 1 is an uncredited version of "Born To Run"
 The Promise (2010): Track 11 on disc 2, listed as "City of Night", also contains a hidden version of "The Way", which begins at 3:25.
 Squad Five-O: Fight the System (1998): "Rock and Roll Anthem" is hidden on track 50 of the album, which has 18 listed songs.
 Squirrel Nut Zippers, Sold Out (1997)   "Pippo's Circus Theme" - starts at 5:49, ends at 7:24; "Santa Claus Is Smoking Reefer" - starts at 7:26, ends at 9:30; "If You Were Mine" - starts at 9:33, ends at 12:48 (These appear after a period of silence on the "Fell To Pieces" track)
 Rebecca St. James:
 God: (1996): "Psalm 139" hidden after "Go and Sin No More".
 Pray: (1998): "Be Thou My Vision" hidden after "Omega" at 5:40.
 Live Worship: Blessed Be Your Name: (2004): "Shout to the Lord" hidden after "The Power of Your Love".
 Staind:
 Tormented (1996): "The Funeral" (At the end of "4 Walls" following the sound of a gunshot)
 Dysfunction (1999): "Excess Baggage" (End of album)
 Staple, Of Truth and Reconciliation (2005): "The Corners I'll Stand On" Plays at 5:27 of last listed track "Final Night"
 Starsailor, Love Is Here : A short clip of the band humming and then consequently laughing can be found at 13:35 of the last track, "Coming Down", after ten minutes and thirty five seconds of silence.
 Static-X, Start a War (2005): "Otsego Amigo (a cappella)" (At the end of "Brainfog")
 Stellar Kart, We Can't Stand Sitting Down: Following a fifteen-second pause after the last listed track "Angels in Chorus", "Hold On (Alternate Version)" plays. As the title suggests, it is an alternate version of a track from earlier on the CD called "Hold On". It's occasionally incorrectly credited as "Hold On (acoustic)", though it is not completely acoustic.
 Stereophonics, Just Enough Education to Perform (2001): "Surprise", follows the last song "Rooftop"
 The Stone Roses, Second Coming (1994): "The Foz", following a long string of empty 4 second tracks on the CD, a discordant instrumental roughly 6 minutes (track 90, sometimes track 42)
 Stone Temple Pilots, Purple (1994) features "My Second Album", a song sung by Richard Petersen, shortly after "Kitchenware & Candybars".
 Angie Stone, Black Diamond (1999): Hidden track 'Without You' follows track 16 'Life Story (Jazz Hop Mix)' on the European edition.
 Joss Stone:
 Mind Body & Soul (2004): "Daniel" at the end of the album
 Introducing Joss Stone (2007): At the very end of the final track, "Music Outro", there is a short song sung by Stone and Vinnie Jones.
 Randy Stonehill:
 The Lazarus Heart: The title track is followed by silence and then a brief joke track, "Silver Cloud Lounge". 
 Thirst (1998): The track "Everything You Know (Is Incorrect)"; is followed by silence and then the humorous hidden track "Keeper of the Bear".
 Story of the Year:
 Page Avenue (2003): A short clip of the band goofing around is found shortly after the end of the final track "Falling Down".
 In Wake of Determination: There is a hidden thirteenth track following a minute of silence. Some refer to the track as 'Silent Murder', however it remains unclear whether this is the track's official name or if it's untitled.
 Izzy Stradlin and the Ju Ju Hounds, Izzy Stradlin and the Ju Ju Hounds (album): A track identified in the liner notes as "Morning Tea" begins approximately 30 seconds after "Come on Now Inside".
 Street Drum Corps, Street Drum Corps (2006): The hidden track "Outro" starts playing after the song "BANG!!"
 Strong Bad et al.: Strong Bad Sings and Other Type Hits (2003): "Secret Song" (Located at 6:20 on the last track, Everybody to the Limit (Live)
 Patrick Stump:
 Soul Punk(2011): "Cryptozoology" - A hidden track playing after "Run Dry (X Heart X Fingers)"
 Styx:
 The Serpent Is Rising (1973): "Plexiglas Toilet" - hidden track after "As Bad as This" on side one.
 Cyclorama (2003): located at approximately 3:03 on the last track.
 Sublime, 40 Oz. to Freedom (1992): "Rivers of Babylon": 2:29 (End of the album) (hidden track on original release), "Thanx" (End of the album)
 Robbin' the Hood (1994): "Don't Push" (End of the album), Untitled dub (End of the album), "The Farther I Go" (Mudhoney cover) (End of the album on original copies)
 The Subs: Decontrol (2011): "The Fuck Song" starts playing at 8:07 of the last track, succeeding a long period of silence.
 Suburban Legends, Let's Be Friends and Slay the Dragon Together (2008): An unlisted track thirteen, presumably called "Natasha".
 The Subways, Young for Eternity (2005): "At 1 am" (End of album)
 Suede, A New Morning (2002): "Oceans" plays a few minutes after the bonus track "You Belong To Me".
 The Sugarcubes, Life's Too Good (1988): On early European vinyl versions an unlisted track was added at the end, later known as "Take Some Petrol, Darling".
 Sugarcult, Start Static (2001): Hidden track at the end of the album: "Underwear".
 Sugar Ray, Lemonade and Brownies (1995): At 6:11 into the song Streaker, a soft song is played (as opposed to the rest of the album.)
 Suicide Silence:
 The Cleansing (2007): Hidden track "Destruction of a Statue" plays after the song "Green Monster".
 You Can't Stop Me (2014): Hidden track "Dogma: I Am God" plays after the song "Ouroboros" (contains only limited edition of the album).
 Sum 41, Underclass Hero (2007): There is a fifteenth track not printed on the album's track listing. It starts with two minutes of silence, then goes over to a song called "Look at Me".
 Super Furry Animals, Guerrilla (1999): "Citizen's Band", hidden in the pregap before track 1 ("Check It Out")
 Out Spaced (1998): "Spaced Out", an untitled track hidden in the pregap before track 1 ("The Man Don't Give a Fuck")
 Supergrass, In It for the Money (1997): Many songs end with codas/snippets of songs played on loop until fade out, two of these include "Richard III" and "Sun Hits the Sky".
 Supertramp, Some Things Never Change (1997): "Give Me A Chance" hidden between tracks 9 and 10.
 The European edition of Sweetbox's Addicted album has the ABBA cover "The Winner Takes It All" as a hidden track.
 Skye Sweetnam, Noise from the Basement (2004): "Split Personality" starts playing after the thirteenth track, "Smoke & Mirrors".
 Switchfoot, New Way to Be Human (1999): An untitled radio jingle is hidden after the final track, "Under the Floor", 0:33 from the back.
 Swollen Members: Heavy (2003): Hidden Track is located at the end of the song "Ambush", located somewhere after 7:04. Note that there is a lot of stuff in between, but none of it is music.
 Sylver: Chances (2001): Two hidden tracks after 2 minutes of silence in the final track "Secrets": "Turn The Tide (CJ Stone Remix)" and "Skin (Velvet Girl Remix)"
 System of a Down, Toxicity: "Arto" plays immediately after the song "Aerials". It is also available as a bonus track on several editions of the album. The song was named after Arto Tunçboyaciyan, a friend and fellow musician (and future collaborator) of the lead singer, Serj Tankian.

See also
 List of backmasked messages
 List of albums with tracks hidden in the pregap

References 

S